New Century Production is an Egyptian film production company established by Walid Al Kurdi in 2004 as a new production branch of Dollar Film, itself first founded in 1949.

Filmography

References

External links 

 New Century Production at the Internet Movie Database

Mass media companies established in 2004
Film production companies of Egypt
Egyptian companies established in 2004